The 2021 Milano–Torino was the 102nd edition of the Milano–Torino cycling classic. It was held on 6 October 2021 as part of the 2021 UCI Europe Tour and the 2021 UCI ProSeries calendars.

After the previous edition's route favoured the sprinters, the race returned to a more hilly route that favoured the climbers, despite being mostly flat. In the final , riders took on two ascents of the Superga hill, which had an average gradient of 9.1 percent, on the outskirts of Turin.

Teams 
15 of the 19 UCI WorldTeams and eight UCI ProTeams made up the 23 teams that participated in the race. Each team entered a full squad of seven riders, although  had one non-starter. Of the 160 riders who started the race, 109 finished, while a further two riders finished outside of the time limit.

UCI WorldTeams

 
 
 
 
 
 
 
 
 
 
 
 
 
 
 

UCI ProTeams

Result

References

External links 
  

2021
Milano–Torino
Milano–Torino
Milano–Torino
Milano–Torino